Epupa is a constituency in the Kunene Region of Namibia. Its population in 2004 was 12,816. , it has 12,182 registered voters.

The villages of Epupa, Otjomuru, Ohamaremba and Okangwati belong to the Epupa constituency. Epupa is the location of the Epupa Falls after which it is named, located on the Angolan-Namibian border.

Politics

The 2015 regional election were won by Nguzu Muharukua of the Democratic Turnhalle Alliance (DTA) with 3,672 votes, closely followed by Jona Kakondo of the SWAPO Party with 3,260 votes. Erwin Muharukua of the Rally for Democracy and Progress (RDP) also ran and gained 52 votes. Epupa was one of only two constituencies won by the DTA in this election.

The 2020 regional election was won by Tjimutambo Kuuoko of the Popular Democratic Movement (PDM, the new name of the DTA). He obtained 4,373 votes, followed by Masatu Thom (SWAPO) with 2,899 votes.

References 

Constituencies of Kunene Region
Otjiherero words and phrases
States and territories established in 1992
1992 establishments in Namibia